Randolph's Landing Area , also known as Randolph's Airport, is a privately owned, public use airport located seven nautical miles (13 km) northeast of the central business district of St. Johns, a city in Clinton County, Michigan, United States.

Facilities and aircraft 
The airport covers an area of 6 acres (2 ha) at an elevation of 700 feet (213 m) above mean sea level. It has one runway designated 5/23 with a turf surface measuring 2,175 by 100 feet (663 x 30 m). For the 12-month period ending December 31, 2005, the airport had 230 general aviation aircraft operations, an average of 19 per month.

References

External links 
 Aerial image as of April 1998 from USGS The National Map

Airports in Michigan
Transportation in Clinton County, Michigan